Port Simpson Water Aerodrome, formerly , was located adjacent to Lax Kw'alaams (Port Simpson), British Columbia, Canada.

References

Defunct seaplane bases in British Columbia
North Coast Regional District